The National Football Conference – Southern Division or NFC South is one of the four divisions of the National Football Conference (NFC) in the National Football League (NFL). It was created prior to the 2002 NFL season, when the league realigned divisions after expanding to 32 teams. The NFC South currently has four member clubs: the Atlanta Falcons, Carolina Panthers, New Orleans Saints, and Tampa Bay Buccaneers. 

Prior to the 2002 season, the Buccaneers belonged to the AFC West and NFC Central (–) (with their four division rivals in the Upper Midwest), while the other three teams were part of the geographically inaccurate NFC West. 

The NFC South is one of two divisions to have each of its teams make a Super Bowl appearance since the 2002 realignment (along with the NFC West): Tampa Bay (2002 and 2020), Atlanta (2016), Carolina (2003 and 2015) and New Orleans (2009). Also since 2002, each team has won at least three division titles, making it one of three divisions in the league (the others are the NFC West and the NFC East) that hold this distinction. On January 3, 2021, the New Orleans Saints became the first ever team to sweep the NFC South in the regular season, despite losing to the eventual Super Bowl champions, the Tampa Bay Buccaneers, in the playoffs.

Entering 2019, the Saints have the most wins among division members. The Saints' record is 375–438–5; their win in Super Bowl XLIV is the highlight of a 10–12 playoff record. The Falcons' record is 365–461–6 with a playoff record of 10–14; the Falcons lost in Super Bowls XXXIII and LI. The Buccaneers' record is 267–424–1 with a victory in both their Super Bowl appearances, Super Bowl XXXVII and Super Bowl LV, and an overall playoff record of 10–9. The Panthers have the best playoff winning percentage (9–8) of any team in the division with losses in Super Bowls XXXVIII and 50, with a regular season record of 195–204–1.

The NFC South is the only NFC division not to have any teams that predate the 1960 launch of the American Football League, the NFL’s former rival league. The oldest team is the Falcons, who began play in 1966, and the Saints began play only a year later in 1967. Each of the other NFC divisions has 3 teams that began play earlier than 1960, while the remaining three such teams are in the American Football Conference.

The NFC South became the second division in five years to have a champion with a losing record, as the 2014 Carolina Panthers won the division with a 7–8–1 record. (The 2010 Seattle Seahawks won the NFC West with a 7–9 record.) Additionally, Carolina became the first team to repeat as NFC South champions since the creation of the division. The Panthers were the first team to win the NFC South three consecutive times, from 2013 to 2015; while the Saints were the first team to win the division four consecutive times from 2017 to 2020. On January 7, 2018, two NFC South teams (the Carolina Panthers and New Orleans Saints) met in the NFL playoffs for the first time since the division's creation in 2002. Before then, they were the only division left in the NFL who had never had teams face off against each other in the postseason.

Division lineups

 Place cursor over year for division champ or Super Bowl team.

Division champions

Wild Card qualifiers

Total Playoff Berths as members of the NFC South
(NFC South records since the division's creation in 2002)

Season results

Asterisk (*) Denotes Current Year

Schedule rotation

Postseason oddities
 From 2003 to 2009, the team that placed last in the division the previous year would improve enough to reach the playoffs, usually by winning the division. Tampa Bay almost continued this trend in 2010, stopped only by losing a tiebreaker to Green Bay.
 Carolina finished last in 2002 (7–9) and finished first in 2003 (11–5).
 Atlanta finished last in 2003 (5–11) and finished first in 2004 (11–5).
 Tampa Bay finished last in 2004 (5–11) and finished first in 2005 (11–5).
 New Orleans finished last in 2005 (3–13) and finished first in 2006 (10–6).
 Tampa Bay finished last in 2006 (4–12) and finished first in 2007 (9–7).
 Atlanta finished last in 2007 (4–12) and finished second with a wild-card berth in 2008 (11–5).
 New Orleans finished last in 2008 (8–8) and finished first in 2009 (13–3).
 Tampa Bay finished last in 2009 (3–13) but despite finishing third in 2010 with a 10–6 record, did not make the playoffs, due to Green Bay holding the wild-card tiebreaker.
 Carolina finished last in 2010 (2–14) and was eliminated from playoff contention in Week 14 of the 2011 season after going 4–9, becoming the first NFC South team to have a losing season after placing last in the division.
 From 2002 to 2009, no team in the NFC South earned back-to-back playoff appearances. In Week 16 of the 2010 season, New Orleans clinched a wild-card berth, becoming the first NFC South team to earn consecutive playoff appearances. New Orleans earned three consecutive playoff appearances in the 2009, 2010, and 2011 seasons and four in a row from 2017-2020. Atlanta also earned three consecutive playoff appearances, in 2010, 2011 and 2012 and Carolina in 2013, 2014 and 2015.
 Each team has won the division at least four times and made a playoff appearance at least five times since the division's formation.
 Each team has finished last in the division at least twice since the division's formation. Prior to 2012, no team has finished last in the division in consecutive seasons. Tampa Bay became the first team in the division to place last in the division in consecutive seasons.
 From 2002 to 2011, there was an outright last place finisher in the division (i.e.: tiebreakers were not necessary to determine who finished last). That streak came to an end during the 2012 season, when Tampa Bay, New Orleans, and Carolina all finished at 7–9. This happened again in 2013, where both Atlanta and Tampa Bay finished 4–12.
 In 2014, Carolina became the first team to defend the NFC South title. No other team in the division has managed to do so until New Orleans defeated Tampa Bay on December 9, 2018 and clinched the division for the second straight season.
 In 2014, Carolina became the second team in NFL history to win its division and advance to the playoffs with a losing record (7–8–1). The first team to accomplish this is the 2010 Seahawks, who won the NFC West with a 7–9 record and beat New Orleans in a Wild Card game.
 With Atlanta winning the 2016–17 NFC Championship, the NFC South became the first division since the 2002 realignment to have all four of its teams represent the NFC in the Super Bowl. (Tampa Bay 2002 and 2020, Carolina 2003 and 2015, New Orleans 2009, Atlanta 2016).
 In the 2017 NFL season the NFC South had three of its teams qualify for the playoffs (Atlanta, New Orleans, Carolina). It was also the first time where two NFC South teams met in the playoffs, when New Orleans hosted and defeated Carolina in the Wild Card playoffs.
 In 2020 the New Orleans Saints became the first team to sweep the entire division as well as win 4 consecutive division titles. They would then lose to the eventual Super Bowl champions, the Tampa Bay Buccaneers, in the playoffs.

See also
Falcons–Panthers rivalry
Falcons–Saints rivalry
Buccaneers–Panthers rivalry
Buccaneers–Saints rivalry

References

National Football League divisions
Atlanta Falcons
Carolina Panthers
New Orleans Saints
Tampa Bay Buccaneers
2002 establishments in the United States
Sports in the Southern United States